RFA War Pathan  (X84) was a War-class tanker of the British Royal Fleet Auxiliary.

The ship was built by Sir James Laing & Sons Ltd. at their Deptford Yard in Sunderland, and launched on 19 March 1919.

Originally managed by Andrew Weir Shipping & Trading Co. Ltd. in 1923 it was transferred to the Royal Fleet Auxiliary, and served throughout World War II.

The ship was sold as a merchant vessel on 16 October 1947 to Bulk Storage Co. (P.Bauer), London and renamed Basing Bank, in 1948 to Basinghall Shipping Co., London, and was scrapped in 1950 at Antwerp.

References

1919 ships
Standard World War I ships
Steamships of the United Kingdom
Merchant ships of the United Kingdom
Ships built on the River Tyne
Tankers of the Royal Fleet Auxiliary